In the United States, there are 352 accredited health information management (HIM) and health informatics (HI) programs. Most of these programs are in the associate degree level. In Canada, there are 19 different HIM programs, mostly in the diploma level. However, all these programs are subjected to an accreditation review by their respective organizations: The Commission on Accreditation for Health Informatics and Information Management Education (CAHIIM in the US) and the Canadian College of Health Information Management (CCHIM in Canada).

United States
The CAHIIM has given full accreditation to the following list of HIM and HI programs. However, the master's degree level programs listed makes little or no difference, in terms of whether it is a HIM, a HI, or even both together.

Associate degree
There are currently 255 American universities and colleges in this list.

Alabama
 Bishop State Community College in  Mobile (Campus based and online)
 Wallace State Community College in  Hanceville (Campus based and online)

Alaska
 University of Alaska Southeast in  Sitka (online only)

Arizona
 Bryan University in  Tempe (online only)
 Central Arizona College in  Coolidge (online only)
 Phoenix College in  Phoenix (Campus based and online)

Arkansas
 Arkansas Tech University–Ozark Campus in  Ozark (Campus based only)
 National Park College in  Hot Springs (Campus based and online)
 Northwest Arkansas Community College in  Bentonville (Campus based and online)

California
 City College of San Francisco in  San Francisco (Campus based and online)
 Cosumnes River College in  Sacramento (online only)
 Cypress College in  Cypress (Campus based and online)
 East Los Angeles College in  Monterey Park (Campus based only)
 Saddleback College in  Mission Viejo (online only)
 San Diego Mesa College in  San Diego (Campus based and online)
 Santa Barbara City College in  Santa Barbara (online only)
 Shasta College in  Redding (online only)

Colorado
 Arapahoe Community College in  Littleton (online only)
 Front Range Community College in  Westminster (Campus based and online)

Connecticut
 Middlesex Community College in  Middletown (Campus based only)

Delaware
 Delaware Technical Community College in  Wilmington (Campus based only)

Florida
 Broward College in  Fort Lauderdale (Campus based only)
 College of Business and Technology in  Miami (Cutler Bay location) (Campus based only)
 College of Central Florida in  Ocala (Campus based and online)
 Daytona State College in  Daytona Beach (Campus based only)
 Florida Gateway College in  Lake City (Campus based and online)
 Florida SouthWestern State College in  Fort Myers (Campus based and online)
 Florida State College at Jacksonville in  Jacksonville (Campus based and online)
 Indian River State College in  Fort Pierce (online only)
 Miami Dade College in  Miami (Campus based only)
 Palm Beach State College in  Lake Worth Beach (Campus based and online)
 Pensacola State College in  Pensacola (Campus based and online)
 Santa Fe College in  Gainesville (online only)
 Seminole State College of Florida in  Sanford (online only)
 St. Johns River State College in  St. Augustine (online only)
 St. Petersburg College in  St. Petersburg (online only)
 Ultimate Medical Academy in  Tampa (online only)
 Valencia College in  Orlando (online only)

Georgia
 Albany State University in  Albany (online only)
 Athens Technical College in  Athens (Campus based only) (Web site is currently offline)
 Atlanta Technical College in  Atlanta (Campus based only)
 Augusta Technical College in  Augusta (Campus based only)
 Georgia Northwestern Technical College in  Walker County (online only)
 Gwinnett Technical College in  Lawrenceville (Campus based only)
 Lanier Technical College in  Gainesville (Campus based and online)
 Ogeechee Technical College in  Statesboro (online only)
 West Georgia Technical College in  Waco (Campus based only)
 Wiregrass Georgia Technical College in  Valdosta (Campus based and online)

Hawaii
 Leeward Community College in  Pearl City (Campus based only)

Idaho
 Idaho State University in  Pocatello (online only)

Illinois
 College of DuPage in  Glen Ellyn (Campus based only)
 College of Lake County in  Grayslake (Campus based only)
 Danville Area Community College in  Danville (Campus based only)
 DeVry University in  Naperville (online only)
 Harper College in  Palatine (Campus based and online)
 Joliet Junior College in  Joliet (Campus based and online)
 McHenry County College in  Crystal Lake (Campus based and online)
 Moraine Valley Community College in  Palos Hills (Campus based only)
 Northwestern College in  Bridgeview (Campus based and online)
 Oakton Community College in  Des Plaines (Campus based only)
 Richland Community College in  Decatur (online only)
 Southwestern Illinois College in  Belleville (Campus based and online)

Indiana
 Indiana Institute of Technology in  Fort Wayne (online only)
 Indiana University Northwest in  Gary (Campus based and online)
 Ivy Tech Community College of Indiana in  Indianapolis and Fort Wayne (Campus based and online respectively)
 Vincennes University in  Vincennes (Campus based and online)

Iowa
 Indian Hills Community College in  Ottumwa (online only)
 Northeast Iowa Community College in  Calmar (Campus based and online)
 Scott Community College in  Riverdale (online only)

Kansas
 Hutchinson Community College in  Hutchinson (online only)
 Neosho County Community College in  Chanute (online only)
 Washburn University in  Topeka (online only)

Kentucky
 American National University in  Louisville (Campus based only)
 Gateway Community and Technical College in  Covington (Campus based and online)
 Hazard Community and Technical College in  Hazard (online only)
 Jefferson Community and Technical College in  Louisville (online only)
 Louisa and Mayfield

Louisiana
 Delgado Community College in  New Orleans (Campus based and online)
 Southern University at Shreveport in  Shreveport (Campus based and online)

Maine
 Beal College in  Bangor (Campus based only)
 Kennebec Valley Community College in  Fairfield (Campus based and online)

Maryland
 Baltimore City Community College in  Baltimore (Campus based only)
 Community College of Baltimore County in  Baltimore County (Campus based and online)
 Montgomery College in  Montgomery County (Campus based and online)
 Prince George's Community College in  Largo (Campus based and online)

Massachusetts
 Fisher College in  Boston (online only)
 Springfield Technical Community College in  Springfield (Campus based only)

Michigan
 Davenport University in  Grand Rapids (online only)
 Ferris State University in  Big Rapids (Campus based only)
 Macomb Community College in  Warren (Campus based and online)
 Schoolcraft College in  Livonia (Campus based only)
 Southwestern Michigan College in  Dowagiac (Campus based only)

Minnesota
 Anoka Technical College in  Anoka (online only)
 Moorhead, Fergus Falls, Detroit Lakes, and Wadena
 Canby, Granite Falls, Jackson, Pipestone, and Worthington
 Bloomington, Brooklyn Park,  Aurora and Rockford, and  Green Bay
 Ridgewater College in  Willmar (online only)
 Rochester Community and Technical College in  Rochester (online only)
 Saint Paul College in  Saint Paul (Campus based and online)
 St. Cloud Technical and Community College in  St. Cloud (Campus based and online)

Mississippi
 Hinds Community College in  Raymond (Campus based and online)
 Itawamba Community College in  Tupelo (Campus based and online)
 Meridian Community College in  Meridian (Campus based and online)
 Southwest Mississippi Community College in  Summit (Campus based and online)

Missouri
 East Central College in  Union (online only)
 Jefferson College in  Hillsboro (Campus based and online)
 Metropolitan Community College in  Kansas City (Campus based and online)
 Ozarks Technical Community College in  Springfield (online only)
 St. Charles Community College in  St. Charles (online only)
 St. Louis Community College at Forest Park in  St. Louis (Campus based and online)
 State Fair Community College in  Sedalia (online only)

Montana
 Great Falls College Montana State University in  Great Falls (online only)

Nebraska
 Central Community College in  Grand Island (online only)
 Clarkson College in  Omaha (online only)
 Metropolitan Community College in  Omaha (online only)
 Northeast Community College in  Norfolk (Campus based and online)
 Western Nebraska Community College in  Scottsbluff (online only)

Nevada
 College of Southern Nevada in  Clark County (Campus based and online)

New Jersey
 Camden County College in  Blackwood (online only)
 Passaic County Community College in  Paterson (Campus based and online)
 Raritan Valley Community College in  Branchburg (online only)
 Rowan College at Burlington County in  Mount Laurel (Campus based and online)

New Mexico
 Central New Mexico Community College in  Albuquerque (online only)
 San Juan College in  Farmington (online only)
 The University of New Mexico in  Gallup (Campus based and online)

New York
 Alfred State College in  Alfred (online only)
 Borough of Manhattan Community College in  New York City (Campus based only)
 SUNY Erie in  Williamsville (Campus based and online)
 Mohawk Valley Community College in  Utica (online only)
 Nassau Community College in  Garden City (Campus based only)
 Onondaga Community College in  Syracuse (Campus based and online)
 Plaza College in  Forest Hills, Queens (New York City) (Campus based only)
 Suffolk County Community College in  Selden (Campus based and online)
 SUNY Broome Community College in  Binghamton (Campus based and online)

North Carolina
 Brunswick Community College in  Bolivia (Campus based only)
 Catawba Valley Community College in  Hickory (Campus based only)
 Central Carolina Community College in  Harnett County (online only)
 Central Piedmont Community College in  Charlotte (online only)
 Craven Community College in  New Bern (Campus based and online)
 Davidson County Community College in  Davidson County (Campus based and online)
 Durham Technical Community College in  Durham (Campus based and online)
 Edgecombe Community College in  Tarboro (online only)
 McDowell Technical Community College in  Marion (Campus based and online)
 Pitt Community College in  Winterville (online only)
 Southwestern Community College in  Sylva (Campus based and online)

North Dakota
 North Dakota State College of Science in  Wahpeton (online only)

Ohio
 Cincinnati State Technical and Community College in  Cincinnati (online only)
 Columbus State Community College in  Columbus (online only)
 Cuyahoga Community College in  Cuyahoga County (Campus based only)
 Eastern Gateway Community College in  Steubenville (Campus based and online)
 Lakeland Community College in  Kirtland (Campus based only)
 Marion Technical College in  Marion (online only)
 Mercy College of Ohio in  Toledo (online only)
 Owens Community College in  Toledo (Campus based and online)
 Sinclair Community College in  Dayton (Campus based and online)
 Stark State College in  North Canton (Campus based and online)
 Terra State Community College in  Fremont (Campus based and online)
 University of Cincinnati in  Cincinnati (online only)
 University of Northwestern Ohio in  Lima (Campus based and online)
 Zane State College in  Zanesville (online only)

Oklahoma
 Rose State College in  Midwest City (Campus based only)
 Tulsa Community College in  Tulsa (Campus based and online)

Oregon
 Central Oregon Community College in  Bend (Campus based only)
 Chemeketa Community College in  Salem (online only)
 Lane Community College in  Eugene (online only)
 Portland Community College in  Portland (online only)

Pennsylvania
 Community College of Allegheny County in  Allegheny County (Campus based only)
 Lehigh Carbon Community College in  Schnecksville (Campus based and online)
 Peirce College in  Philadelphia (Campus based and online)
 State College & Altoona

Puerto Rico
 Huertas College in  Caguas (Campus based only and in Spanish)

South Carolina
 Florence–Darlington Technical College in  Florence (Campus based only)
 Greenville Technical College in  Greenville (Campus based and online)
 Trident Technical College in  Charleston (Campus based only)

South Dakota
 Dakota State University in  Madison (Campus based and online)
 National American University in  Rapid City (online only)

Tennessee
 Concorde Career College in  Memphis (Campus based only)
 Dyersburg State Community College in  Dyersburg (online only)
 Roane State Community College in  Harriman (online only)
 Volunteer State Community College in  Gallatin (Campus based and online)
 Walters State Community College in  Morristown (online only)

Texas
 Austin Community College District in  Austin (Campus based only)
 Blinn College in  Brenham (online only)
 College of the Mainland in  Texas City (Campus based and online)
 Collin College in  Collin County (online only)
 Del Mar College in  Corpus Christi (Campus based and online)
 El Paso Community College in  El Paso (Campus based and online)
 Houston Community College in  Houston (Campus based and online)
 Lamar Institute of Technology in  Beaumont (online only)
 Lee College in  Baytown (Campus based and online)
 Lone Star College–North Harris in  Harris County (online only)
 McLennan Community College in  Waco (online only)
 Midland College in  Midland (online only)
 Panola College in  Carthage (Campus based and online)
 San Jacinto College in  Houston (Campus based and online)
 South Texas College in  McAllen (Campus based and online)
 St. Philip's College in  San Antonio (online only)
 Tarrant County College in  Fort Worth (Campus based only)
 Texas State Technical College in  Abilene (online only)
 Tyler Junior College in  Tyler (online only)
 Vernon College in  Vernon (Campus based and online)
 Wharton County Junior College in  Wharton (online only)

Utah
 Weber State University in  Ogden (Campus based and online)

Virginia
 ECPI University in  Newport News and Richmond (online only)
 Lord Fairfax Community College in  Middletown (online only)
 Mountain Empire Community College in  Big Stone Gap (Campus based and online)
 Northern Virginia Community College in  Springfield (Campus based and online)
 Tidewater Community College in  Virginia Beach (Campus based only)

Washington
 Shoreline Community College in  Shoreline (online only)
 Spokane Community College in  Spokane (Campus based and online)
 Tacoma Community College in  Tacoma (online only)

West Virginia
 Blue Ridge Community and Technical College in  Martinsburg (Campus based and online)
 Mountwest Community and Technical College in  Huntington (Campus based and online)
 Pierpont Community and Technical College in  Fairmont (Campus based only)
 West Virginia Northern Community College in  Wheeling (Campus based and online)

Wisconsin
 Chippewa Valley Technical College in  Eau Claire (Campus based and online)
 Fox Valley Technical College in  Grand Chute (Campus based and online)
 Gateway Technical College in  Kenosha (online only)
 Herzing University in  Milwaukee (online only)
 Lakeshore Technical College in  Cleveland (Campus based and online)
 Mid-State Technical College in  Marshfield (online only)
 Moraine Park Technical College in  Fond du Lac (online only)
 Northeast Wisconsin Technical College in  Green Bay (online only)
 Southwest Wisconsin Technical College in  Fennimore (online only)
 Waukesha County Technical College in  Pewaukee (Campus based and online)
 Western Technical College in  La Crosse (Campus based and online)
 Wisconsin Indianhead Technical College in  Shell Lake (online only)

Bachelor's degree
There are currently 73 American universities and colleges in this list.

A
 Alabama State University in  Montgomery (Campus based only)
 American Public University System in  Charles Town (online only)
 Arkansas Tech University in  Russellville (Campus based only)
 Ashford University in  San Diego (online only)
 Augusta University in  Augusta (Campus based and online)

C
 Charter Oak State College in  New Britain (online only)
 Chicago State University in  Chicago (Campus based only)
 Clarkson College in  Omaha (online only)
 Coppin State University in  Baltimore (Campus based and online)
 CUNY School of Professional Studies in  New York City (online only)

D
 Dakota State University in  Madison (Campus based and online)
 Davenport University in  Grand Rapids (online only)
 DeVry University in  Naperville (online only)

E
 East Carolina University in  Greenville (Campus based only)
 Eastern Kentucky University in  Richmond (Campus based only)

F
 Ferris State University in  Big Rapids (Campus based and online)
 Fisher College in  Boston (online only)
 Florida A&M University in  Tallahassee (Campus based only)
 Franklin University in  Columbus (online only)

G
 Grand Valley State University in  Allendale (Campus based only)

H
 Herzing University in  Milwaukee (online only)

I
 Illinois State University in  Normal (Campus based and online)
 Indiana University in  Indianapolis (Campus based and online)
 Indiana University Northwest in  Gary (Campus based and online)

K
 Keiser University in  Fort Lauderdale (online only)

L
 Loma Linda University in  Loma Linda (Campus based and online)
 Long Island University (LIU Post) in  Brookville (Campus based and online)
 Louisiana Tech University in  Ruston (Campus based and online)

M
 Missouri Western State University in  St. Joseph (online only)

P
 Parker University in  Dallas (online only)
 Peirce College in  Philadelphia (Campus based and online)

R
 Rasmussen College in  Bloomington (online only)
 Rutgers University in  New Brunswick (online only)

S
 Saint Joseph's College of Maine in  Standish (online only)
 Saint Louis University in  St. Louis (Campus based only)
 San Diego Mesa College in  San Diego (Campus based and online)
 Shasta College in  Redding (online only)
 Southern New Hampshire University in  Manchester (online only)
 Southern University at New Orleans in  New Orleans (Campus based and online)
 Southwestern Oklahoma State University in  Weatherford (online only)
 Stephens College in  Columbia (online only)
 SUNY Polytechnic Institute in  Albany (online only)

T
 Tacoma Community College in  Tacoma (online only)
 Temple University in  Philadelphia (Campus based only)
 Tennessee State University in  Nashville (Campus based and online)
 Texas Southern University in  Houston (Campus based only)
 Texas State University in  San Marcos (Campus based and online)
 The College of St. Scholastica in  Duluth (Campus based and online)
 The Ohio State University in  Columbus (Campus based only)

U
 University of Central Florida in  Orange County (Campus based and online)
 University of Cincinnati in  Cincinnati (online only)
 University of Detroit Mercy in  Detroit (Campus based and online)
 University of Illinois at Chicago in  Chicago (Campus based and online)
 University of Kansas Medical Center in  Kansas City (Campus based and online)
 University of Louisiana at Lafayette in  Lafayette (Campus based only)
 University of Mississippi Medical Center in  Jackson (online only)
 University of Pittsburgh in  Pittsburgh (Campus based only)
 University of Puerto Rico, Medical Sciences Campus in  San Juan (Campus based only) (Web site is currently offline)
 University of Saint Mary in  Leavenworth (Campus based only)
 University of South Carolina Upstate in  Spartanburg (online only)
 University of Toledo in  Toledo (online only)
 University of Washington in  Seattle (Campus based only)
 University of Wisconsin–Green Bay in Green Bay
 University of Wisconsin–Parkside in Somers
 University of Wisconsin–Stevens Point in Stevens Point

W
 Weber State University in  Ogden (Campus based and online)
 Western Governors University in  Salt Lake City (online only)
 Western Kentucky University in  Bowling Green (online only)
 William Carey University in  Hattiesburg (Campus based only)

Master's degree in health information management
 Dakota State University in  Madison (online only)
 Davenport University in  Grand Rapids (online only)
 Texas State University in  San Marcos (online only)
 The College of St. Scholastica in  Duluth (online only)
 University of Tennessee Health Science Center in  Memphis (online only)

Master's degree in health informatics

 Boston University in  Boston (Campus based and online)
 Drexel University in  Philadelphia (online only)
 East Carolina University in  Greenville (Campus based and online)
 Florida International University in  University Park (online only)
 George Mason University in  Fairfax County (Campus based and online)
 Indiana University in  Indianapolis (Campus based and online)
 Louisiana Tech University in  Ruston (online only)
 Marshall University in  Huntington (Campus based only)
 Medical University of South Carolina in  Charleston (Campus based and online)
 Oregon Health & Science University in  Portland (online only)
 Southern Illinois University Edwardsville in  Edwardsville (online only)
 Temple University in  Philadelphia (Campus based and online)

 The College of St. Scholastica in  Duluth (online only)
 University of Alabama at Birmingham in  Birmingham (online only)
 University of Central Florida in  Orange County (online only)
 University of Illinois at Chicago in  Chicago (online only)
 University of Maryland Global Campus in  Adelphi (online only)
 University of Mississippi Medical Center in  Jackson (online only)
 University of Pittsburgh in  Pittsburgh (Campus based only)
 University of South Carolina in  Columbia (Campus based and online)
 University of Texas Health Science Center at Houston in  Houston (Campus based and online)
 University of Washington in  Seattle (Campus based only)

Canada
In Canada, the Canadian College of Health Information Management (CCHIM) has listed the following accredited Canadian institutions.

Certificate
 : 3M Clinical Documentation Improvement Specialist Program
 : HealthCareCAN/CHA Learning Health Information Coding Specialist in Ottawa
 : HealthCareCAN/CHA Learning Health Information Management (in conjunction with Algonquin College) in Ottawa
 : McMaster University in Hamilton

Diploma
 : Southern Alberta Institute of Technology in Calgary
 : Red River College in Winnipeg
 : Centre for Distance Education (CD-ED) in Sydney
 : Nova Scotia Community College in Halifax
 : Fleming College in Peterborough
 : George Brown College in Toronto
 : St. Lawrence College in Kingston
 : Westervelt College in London
 : Collège Laflèche in Trois-Rivières (in French)
 : O'Sullivan College in Montreal (understanding of French recommended)
 : Saskatchewan Polytechnic in Regina

Postbaccalaureate diploma
 : Douglas College in Coquitlam

Postgraduate certificate
 : University of Victoria in Victoria

Bachelor's degree
 : Conestoga College in Kitchener

Master's degree
 : Johnson Shoyama Graduate School of Public Policy in Saskatoon & Regina

References

Healthcare in the United States
Healthcare in Canada
Health informatics